Mia Begović (born 11 January 1963) is a Croatian film, stage and television actress. She is best known as the younger sister of the late Croatian actress Ena Begović.

Personal life 
Born in Trpanj to mother Terezija and father Nikola Begović, Mia is the younger sister of the late actress, Ena, who died in a traffic accident on the island of Brač, in August 2000.

Mia was married to the famous water polo player, Ronald Lopatni, with whom she has a daughter born in 1991, Maja Lena.

In 2004 Mia married Željko Žnidarić, but the couple got divorced in 2010. 

She lives and works in Zagreb.

Filmography
Villa Maria (2004)
Zabranjena ljubav (2005)
Tata i zetovi (2006–2007)
Ponos Ratkajevih (2007–2008)
Zakon ljubavi (2008)
Periferija City (2010)

References

External links
 

Living people
1963 births
Croatian actresses